The International Association of Jewish Genealogical Societies, Inc. (IAJGS) is an independent non-profit umbrella organization coordinating the activities and annual conference of 84 Jewish genealogical societies worldwide.

History
The IAJGS was formed in the late-1980s. Rabbi Malcolm H. Stern and Sallyann Amdur Sack were instrumental in creating the initial concept, and assisted various member organizations with their formation.

Annual conferences
The IAJGS coordinates an annual conference on Jewish genealogy, which takes place in a different city each year. The conferences have an educational track and include opportunities for networking and meetings with SIGs and BOF groups. Topics like DNA testing are typically covered. In recent years, attendees have described success stories after hitting research roadblocks.

Future conferences
 2020: San Diego, CA, 40th IAJGS International Conference on Jewish Genealogy. August 9–14, 2020 at the Sheraton San Diego Hotel & Marina

Past conferences
 1981: New York City, Summer Seminar on Jewish Genealogy
 1982: Washington DC, Summer Seminar on Jewish Genealogy II
 1983: Los Angeles, 3rd National Summer Seminar on Jewish Genealogy
 1984: Chicago, 4th National Summer Seminar on Jewish Genealogy
 1984: Jerusalem, International Seminar on Jewish Genealogy
 1985: New York City, 5th National Summer Seminar on Jewish Genealogy
 1986: Salt Lake City, 6th National Summer Seminar on Jewish Genealogy
 1987: London, 2nd International Jewish Genealogy Conference
 1988: Washington DC, 7th Summer Seminar on Jewish Genealogy
 1989: Philadelphia, 8th National Seminar on Jewish Genealogy
 1990: Los Angeles, 9th Annual Seminar on Jewish Genealogy
 1991: Salt Lake City, 3rd International Seminar on Jewish Genealogy
 1992: New York City, 11th Annual Seminar on Jewish Genealogy
 1993: Toronto, 12th Annual International Summer Seminar on Jewish Genealogy
 1994: Jerusalem, 4th International Seminar on Jewish Genealogy
 1995: Washington DC, 14th Summer Seminar on Jewish Genealogy. June 25–29, 1995
 1996: Boston, 15th Summer Seminar on Jewish Genealogy – hosted by the JGS of Greater Boston. July 14–19, 1996, at the Boston Park Plaza
 1997: Paris, 5th International Seminar on Jewish Genealogy / 5e Congrès International de Généalogie Juive
 1998: Los Angeles, 18th Annual Seminar on Jewish Genealogy. July 12–17, 1998
 1999: New York City, 19th Annual Conference on Jewish Genealogy – hosted by the Jewish Genealogical Society New York (JGSNY). August 8–13, 1999, at the New York Marriott
 2000: Salt Lake City, 20th Annual Conference on Jewish Genealogy. July 9–14, 2000, at DoubleTree Suites by Hilton Hotel Salt Lake City
 2001: London, 21st International Conference on Jewish Genealogy – hosted by the JGS of Great Britain. July 8–13, 2001 at the  Hotel Inter-Continental London
 2002: Toronto, 22nd IAJGS International Conference on Jewish Genealogy – hosted by the Jewish Genealogical Society of Canada (Toronto). August 4–9, 2002, at Sheraton Centre Toronto Hotel
 2003: Washington DC, 23rd IAJGS International Conference on Jewish Genealogy – hosted by Jewish Genealogy Society of Greater Washington. July 20–25, 2003, at the JW Marriott Hotel
 2004: Jerusalem, 24th IAJGS International Conference on Jewish Genealogy – hosted by the Israel Genealogical Society. July 4–9, 2004, at the Renaissance Jerusalem Hotel
 2005: Las Vegas, 25th IAJGS International Conference on Jewish Genealogy – hosted by Jewish Genealogy Society of Southern Nevada. July 10–15, 2005, at the Flamingo Las Vegas
 2006: New York City, 26th IAJGS International Conference on Jewish Genealogy – hosted by Jewish Genealogical Society (NY). August 13–18, 2006, at New York Marriott Marquis Hotel
 2007: Salt Lake City, 27th IAJGS International Conference on Jewish Genealogy – hosted by IAJGS. July 15–20, 2007, at Hilton City Center
 2008: Chicago, 28th IAJGS International Conference on Jewish Genealogy – co-hosted by IAJGS, Jewish Genealogical Society of Illinois and Illiana Jewish Genealogical Society. August 17–22, 2008, at Chicago Marriott Downtown Magnificent Mile
 2009: Philadelphia, 29th IAJGS International Conference on Jewish Genealogy – co-hosted by IAJGS and Jewish Genealogical Society of Greater Philadelphia. August 2–7, 2009, at Sheraton Philadelphia City
 2010: Los Angeles, 30th IAJGS International Conference on Jewish Genealogy – hosted by Jewish Genealogical Society of Los Angeles. July 11–16, 2010, at JW Marriott Los Angeles LA LIVE
 2011: Washington DC, 31st IAJGS International Conference on Jewish Genealogy – hosted by Jewish Genealogy Society of Greater Washington DC. August 14–19, 2011, at Grand Hyatt Washington Center Hotel
 2012: Paris, 32nd IAJGS International Conference on Jewish Genealogy – hosted by Cercle de Généalogie Juive in partnership with Jewish Genealogical Societies of Switzerland, Belgium and Luxembourg. July 15–18, 2012, at Paris Marriott Rive Gauche Hotel & Conference Center
 2013: Boston, 33rd IAJGS International Conference on Jewish Genealogy – co-hosted by IAJGS and Jewish Genealogical Society of Greater Boston. August 4–9, 2013, at Boston Park Plaza
 2014: Salt Lake City, 34th IAJGS International Conference on Jewish Genealogy – co-hosted by IAJGS and Utah Jewish Genealogical Society. July 27–August 1, 2014, at Hilton City Center
 2015: Jerusalem, 35th IAJGS International Conference on Jewish Genealogy – co-hosted by IAJGS and Israel Genealogy Research Association and IGS. July 6–10, 2015, at the Ramada Hotel Jerusalem
 2016: Seattle, 36th IAJGS International Conference on Jewish Genealogy – co-hosted by IAJGS and Jewish Genealogical Society of Washington State and local host Jewish Genealogical Society of Oregon. August 7–12, 2016, at the Sheraton Seattle
 2017: Orlando, 37th Annual IAJGS International Conference on Jewish Genealogy – co-hosted by IAJGS and the International Association of Jewish Genealogical Societies and the Jewish Genealogical Society of Greater Orlando. July 23-28, 2017, at Walt Disney World Swan Resort Orlando
 2018: Warsaw, 38th IAJGS International Conference on Jewish Genealogy co-hosted by POLIN Museum of the History of Polish Jews, Emanuel Ringelblum Jewish Historical Institute of Warsaw in cooperation with The Polish State Archives. August 5–10, 2018, at Hilton Warsaw Hotel and Convention Centre
 2019: Cleveland, 39th IAJGS International Conference on Jewish Genealogy – 39th IAJGS International Conference on Jewish Genealogy with local host The Jewish Genealogy Society of Cleveland. July 28–August 2, 2019, at the Hilton Cleveland Downtown Hotel

International Jewish Genealogy Month
International Jewish Genealogy Month honors Jewish ancestors through the pursuit of Jewish family history research. IAJGS sponsors and supports International Jewish Genealogy Month by holding an annual poster contest. The goal of International Jewish Genealogy Month is to encourage Jewish genealogy and publicize JGS organizations and activities all over the world. It is celebrated annually on the Hebrew month of Cheshvan. From 1999 through 2006, Avotaynu, Inc. promoted Jewish Genealogy Month until 2007 when IAJGS began sponsoring the event.

Member organizations
IAJGS supported member organizations offer regular meetings and educational events, often centered around genealogical subjects like DNA genealogy and other specialized research.

Jewish Genealogical Societies

Non-USA members

 Argentina
 Asociación de Genealogía Judía de Argentina
 Australia
 Australian Jewish Genealogical Society, Inc.
 Australian Jewish Genealogical Society (Victoria), Inc.
 Jewish Genealogy & History Society of South Australia
 Belgium
 Cercle de Généalogie Juive de Belgique aka Kring voor Joodse Genealogie in Belgie
 Brazil
 Sociedade de Genealogia Judaica do Rio de Janeiro (SGJRJ)
 Sociedade Genealógica Judaica São Paulo
 Canada
 Genealogical Institute of the Jewish Heritage Centre of Western Canada, Inc.
 Jewish Genealogical Society of British Columbia
 Jewish Genealogical Society of Hamilton & Area
 Jewish Genealogical Society of Montreal
 Jewish Genealogical Society of Ottawa
 Jewish Genealogical Society of Toronto
 Denmark
 Jewish Genealogical Society of Denmark
 France
 Cercle de Généalogie Juive
 Germany
 Hamburger Gesellschaft für Jüdische Genealogie e.v.
 Great Britain
 Jewish Genealogical Society of Great Britain
 Israel
 Amoetat Akevoth (Dutch Jewish Genealogical Data Base)
 Israel Genealogy Research Association (IGRA)
 Israel Genealogical Society
  Israeli “Family Roots” Forum (Hebrew)
 Jamaica
 Jamaica Jewish Genealogical Society
 South Africa
 Jewish Genealogical Society of South Africa
 Sweden
 Judiska Släktforskningsföreningen i Sverige
 Switzerland
 Schweizerische Vereinigung für Jüdische Genealogie
 Venezuela
 Asociación de Genealogía Judía de Venezuela

USA members

 Arizona
 Phoenix Jewish Genealogy Society 
 California
 Jewish Genealogical Society of the Conejo Valley and Ventura County
 Jewish Genealogical Society of Los Angeles
 Orange County Jewish Genealogy Society
 Jewish Genealogical Society of Sacramento
 San Diego Jewish Genealogical Society
 San Francisco Bay Area Jewish Genealogical Society
 Colorado
 Jewish Genealogical Society of Colorado
 Connecticut
 Jewish Genealogical Society of Connecticut
 District of Columbia
 Jewish Genealogy Society of Greater Washington – includes Maryland and Virginia
 Florida
 Jewish Genealogical Society of Broward County, Inc.
 Jewish Genealogical Society of Greater Miami, Inc.
 Jewish Genealogy Society of Northeast Florida
 Jewish Genealogical Society of Greater Orlando
 Jewish Genealogical Society of Palm Beach County, Inc.
 Jewish Genealogical Society of Southwest Florida 
 Jewish Genealogical Society of Tallahassee
 Jewish Genealogical Society of Tampa Bay
 Jewish Genealogy SIG of The Villages Genealogical Society
 Georgia
 Jewish Genealogical Society of Georgia
 Illinois
 Jewish Genealogical Society of Illinois
 Indiana
 Northeast Indiana Jewish Genealogy Society
 Michiana Jewish Historical Society (Indiana)
 Maine
 Documenting Maine Jewry
 Maryland
 Jewish Genealogy Society of Central Maryland
 Jewish Genealogy Society of Maryland
 Massachusetts
 Jewish Genealogical Society of Greater Boston, Inc.
 Western Massachusetts Jewish Genealogical Society
 Michigan
 Jewish Genealogical Society of Michigan
 Minnesota
 Minnesota Jewish Genealogical Society
 Missouri:
 Jewish Genealogical Society of Greater Kansas City
 Jewish SIG of the St. Louis Genealogical Society
 Nevada
 Jewish Genealogy Society Southern Nevada, Inc.
 New Jersey
 Jewish Historical Society of Central Jersey
 Jewish Genealogical Society of North Jersey
 Mercer County Jewish Genealogy Society at Beth El Synagogue
 New Mexico
 Jewish Genealogical Society of New Mexico
 New York
 Capital Region Jewish Genealogical Society (Albany Area)
 Jewish Genealogical Society of Brooklyn
 Jewish Genealogical Society of Buffalo
 Jewish Genealogical Society, Inc.
 Jewish Genealogy Society of Long Island
 North Carolina
 Triangle Jewish Genealogical Society
 Western North Carolina Jewish Genealogical Society
 Ohio
 Jewish Genealogy Society of Cleveland
 Jewish Genealogical Group, Columbus Jewish Historical Society
 Miami Valley Jewish Genealogical and Historical Society
 Oklahoma
 Jewish Genealogical Society of Tulsa
 Oregon
 Jewish Genealogical Society of Oregon
 Jewish Genealogical Society of Willamette Valley Oregon
 Pennsylvania
 Jewish Genealogical Society of Greater Philadelphia
 Jewish Genealogy Society of Pittsburgh
 Tennessee
 Jewish Genealogical Society of Nashville
 Texas
 Dallas Jewish Historical Society, Jewish Genealogy Interest Group
 Greater Houston Jewish Genealogical Society
 Jewish Genealogical Society of San Antonio
 Utah:
 Utah Jewish Genealogical Society
 Washington
 Jewish Genealogical Society of Washington State

Topical members
 Kremenets District Research Group
 Sephardic Heritage Project

Associate members
 Anyksciai Cousins‘ Club – Worldwide
 Bene Israel Heritage Museum & Genealogical Research Centre – Mumbai, India
 The Jewish Genealogy Group of the Tiszafüredi Menóra Nyílt Alapítvány – Tiszafüred, Hungary
 JewishGen
 MyHeritage
Gesher Galicia

See also 
 Jewish genealogy
 JewishGen
 Australian Jewish Historical Society
 Jewish Genealogical Society of Great Britain

References

External links 
 

Jewish organizations
Jewish genealogy
Genealogical societies in the United States